Psalistops is a genus of brushed trapdoor spiders first described by Eugène Simon in 1889.

Species
 it contains twelve species in South America and the Caribbean:
Psalistops fulvus Bryant, 1948 – Hispaniola
Psalistops gasci Maréchal, 1996 – French Guiana
Psalistops maculosus Bryant, 1948 – Hispaniola
Psalistops melanopygius Simon, 1889 (type) – Venezuela
Psalistops montigena (Simon, 1889) – Venezuela
Psalistops nigrifemuratus Mello-Leitão, 1939 – Brazil
Psalistops opifex (Simon, 1889) – Venezuela
Psalistops solitarius (Simon, 1889) – Venezuela
Psalistops steini (Simon, 1889) – Venezuela
Psalistops tigrinus Simon, 1889 – Venezuela
Psalistops venadensis Valerio, 1986 – Costa Rica
Psalistops zonatus Simon, 1889 – Venezuela

References

Barychelidae
Mygalomorphae genera
Spiders of Central America
Spiders of South America
Taxa named by Eugène Simon